Chalcosyrphus pretiosus is a species of hoverfly in the family Syrphidae.

Distribution
Cuba.

References

Eristalinae
Insects described in 1861
Diptera of North America
Taxa named by Hermann Loew